St Margarets railway station is on the Hertford East branch line off the West Anglia Main Line in the east of England, serving the villages of Stanstead St Margarets and Stanstead Abbotts, Hertfordshire. Its three-letter station code is SMT. It is in the civil parish of Great Amwell.

The station and all trains calling are operated by Greater Anglia.

St Margarets was previously the junction with the now closed Buntingford Branch Line to Buntingford.

There is a ticket office that is open at peak times as well as a self-service ticket machine.
The Oyster card system was extended through to Hertford East and became operational at St Margaret's in 2015.

Services
The typical Monday-Saturday off-peak service is two trains per hour to London Liverpool Street via Tottenham Hale, and two trains per hour to Hertford East.

The typical peak service towards London is three trains per hour, two of which are for Liverpool Street via Seven Sisters and one is for Stratford via Tottenham Hale.

The typical service on a Sunday is two trains per hour to Stratford via Tottenham Hale.

Services are generally formed of Class 720 trains.

Oyster cards are accepted at the station.

References

External links

Railway stations in Hertfordshire
DfT Category E stations
Former Great Eastern Railway stations
Railway stations in Great Britain opened in 1843
Greater Anglia franchise railway stations
1843 establishments in England
Great Amwell